The Women's China Squash Open 2015 is the women's edition of the 2015 China Squash Open, which is a tournament of the PSA World Tour event International (prize money: 58 000 $). The event took place in Shanghai in China from 3 to 6 September. Raneem El Weleily won her first China Squash Open trophy, beating Nouran Gohar in the final.

Prize money and ranking points
For 2015, the prize purse was $58,000. The prize money and points breakdown is as follows:

Seeds

Draw and results

See also
PSA World Tour 2015
China Squash Open
Men's China Squash Open 2015

References

External links
WSA China Squash Open 2015 website
China Squash Open 2015 SquashSite website

Squash tournaments in China
China Squash Open
Squash Open
2015 in women's squash